Aymaç is a nature park in the Dereli district of Giresun Province located in the eastern Black Sea Region of Turkey. It was made the 222nd natural park in Turkey on September 21, 2017.

It is located between the Kümbet and Uzundere villages of Dereli. From Giresun it is reached via an asphalt road starting in the east end of the city centre and going south to Dereli and Kümbet. It is also the ceremony and entertainment place for International High Plateau Festivities of Kümbet. Aymaç is characterized by its pastures and rich forest composed from oriental spruces (ladini in Turkish)).

References 

Dereli District
Geography of Giresun Province